

Personal life
Osman belongs to the Naleye Ahmed sub-subsection of the Mohamoud Garad branch of the Dhulbahante Harti Darod clan.

Career

Early career
In 2009, Osman served as the Minister of Aviation of the autonomous Puntland state in northeastern Somalia. He later helped form Khatumo State administration, acting as one of its three "presidents".

In 2013, Osman presented himself as a Vice President candidate in the 2014 Puntland elections, which took place on 8 January 2014 in Garowe. Abdihakim Abdullahi Haji Omar was eventually declared the winner.

In 2019, Osman was elected as a Vice President of Puntland working underneath the newly elected president Said Deni.

Minister of Interior

Appointment
On 28 January 2014, Osman was appointed Puntland's Minister of Interior by the region's new President Abdiweli Mohamed Ali.

Telecommunications reform
In October 2014, Osman issued a decree through the Puntland Ministry of Interior ordering all local telecommunication firms and remittance stores to require a Puntland identity card from their customers before providing services. According to the ministry, the directive is part of a broader initiative aimed at strengthening security and data collection. It also set an immediate timeframe for the decree's implementation.

Money remittance policy
In March 2015, Puntland President Abdiweli Mohamed Ali established a government committee to formulate an official money remittance policy for the Puntland regional state. Puntland Minister of Interior Osman serves as the Chairman of the new panel. The committee is composed of Puntland cabinet members.

Karkar delegation
In March 2015, Puntland Minister of Interior Osman and other regional state officials launched a reconciliation conference in support of peace agreements that had been signed in Rakko district and other parts of the Karkar province. A high-level Puntland government delegation consisting of politicians and other officials was dispatched to the area to enforce the treaties. According to Osman, the delegates were led by Puntland Vice President Abdihakim Abdullahi Haji Omar, with the negotiation meeting concluding successfully.

See also
Shire Haji Farah

References

Living people
Ethnic Somali people
Vice presidents of Puntland
Somalian Muslims
Year of birth missing (living people)